Far is an unincorporated community in Wetzel County, West Virginia, United States.

History
A post office called Far was established in 1901, and remained in operation until 1934. The origin of the name "Far" is obscure.

References

Unincorporated communities in Wetzel County, West Virginia
Unincorporated communities in West Virginia